James Boyce may refer to:

James Petigru Boyce (1827–1888), American theologian
James F. Boyce (1868–1935), American chemist
James Boyce (Louisiana politician) (1922–1990), American businessman and chairman of the Louisiana Republican Party
Jim Boyce (born 1944), former Vice-President of FIFA
Jimmy Boyce (1947–1994), British politician
James Boyce (author), Tasmanian academic and anti-gambling advocate